Wallisson Luiz Alves Máximo (born 23 September 1997), simply known as Wallisson, is a Brazilian professional footballer who plays as a midfielder for Cruzeiro.

Club career
Born in Central de Minas, Minas Gerais, Wallisson began his career with local side  in 2015. He moved to Holanda later in the year, appearing for the club in the 2015 Copa Amazonas.

Wallison played for the under-20 side of Holanda during the 2016 season, as the club did not have a senior squad active. He represented Portuguesa-RJ in 2017, also in the under-20 category.

In November 2017, Wallisson was included in Democrata-GV's squad for the 2018 Campeonato Mineiro.

On 7 May 2019, Wallisson was presented at Volta Redonda, on loan from Serra Macaense. He signed a permanent deal with Voltaço on 7 October, and was regularly used afterwards.

On 11 January 2022, after a short period at Nova Venécia (where he won the Copa Espírito Santo), Wallisson signed for Athletic-MG. On 12 April, he moved to Série B side Ponte Preta.

On 4 August 2022, after already becoming a starter for Ponte, Wallisson renewed his contract with the club until 2027. In December, however, he terminated his link after alleging unpaid wages.

On 20 December 2022, Wallisson was announced at Cruzeiro, newly promoted to the Série A.

Career statistics

Honours
Nova Venécia
Copa Espírito Santo: 2021

References

1997 births
Living people
Sportspeople from Minas Gerais
Brazilian footballers
Association football midfielders
Campeonato Brasileiro Série B players
Esporte Clube Democrata players
Volta Redonda FC players
Associação Atlética Ponte Preta players
Cruzeiro Esporte Clube players